Treba may refer to :

 Latin name of present Trevi nel Lazio, town and former bishopric, now a Latin Catholic titular see
 Treba (river), right tributary of the Trieb in Saxony, Germany